Criollo is a grateable Mexican cheese similar to Munster cheese.  It is a specialty of the region around Taxco, Guerrero. It is one of the few yellow cheeses made in Mexico.

See also
 Cheeses of Mexico
 List of cheeses

References

Mexican cheeses
Taxco